The Brunei Barracudas, also known as Team Barracudas was a professional basketball team based in Brunei Darussalam which saw action in the ASEAN Basketball League from 2009 to 2012. They played their home games at the Brunei Indoor Stadium (called Barracudas Reef by its supporters) in the Bruneian capital of Bandar Seri Begawan. The Barracudas folded in 2012 and did not see action in the 2012 season.

Final roster

Notable players

  Francis Adriano
  Leo Avenido
  Don Camaso
  Michael Pilgrim
  Lonnie Jones
  Reggie Larry
  Simon Conn
 Md. Jamri Ramlee
 Benjamin N. Sim
 Esmond Tan
  Ramsey Williams
  Chester Tolomia
  Bryan Faundo
  Chris Commons
  Chris Garnett
  Md. Badri Suhaili
 Aik Hock Lim
 Mizi Noor Deen
 Afif Khalidi
 Benjamin Lim

External links
 Brunei Barracudas group on Facebook
 www.bruneibasketball.com

ASEAN Basketball League teams
Basketball in Brunei
Sport in Brunei
Basketball teams established in 2009